Cochin International Airport  is an international airport serving the city of Kochi, in the state of Kerala, India. The airport is first of its kind which is developed under a public-private partnership (PPP) model in India. This project was funded by nearly 10,000 non-resident Indians from 32 countries. , the Cochin International Airport caters to 61.8% of the total air passenger movement in Kerala. It is the fourth busiest airport in India in terms of international traffic and also ninth busiest overall. In fiscal year 2018–19, the airport handled more than 10.2 million passengers with a total of 71,871 aircraft movements.

In 2015, Cochin International Airport became the world's first fully solar powered airport with the inauguration of a dedicated solar plant. For this entrepreneurial vision, the airport won the coveted Champion of the Earth award in 2018, the highest environmental honour instituted by the United Nations. The airport was awarded The Best Airport in Asia-Pacific in 2020 (5 to 15 million passengers per annum) by Airports Council International.

History
Kochi's airport began as an airstrip on Willingdon Island, built in 1936 by the Kingdom of Cochin, intended for transporting officials involved in the development of the Cochin Port. The Kingdom of Cochin allowed the British, who ruled India at the time, to convert the airstrip into a military airport for use by the Indian Navy during World War II. The Royal Navy chose it as a strategic site for their headquarters in Southern India and as an air station cum landing craft and seaplane base. The military facility hosted naval fighter planes and was intended to thwart possible Japanese air raids. A small naval unit set up operations just two days before the outbreak of World War II.

After India achieved dominion status, and the merger of the Kingdom of Cochin with India, the Indian Navy operated the airport, though it permitted civilian aircraft to use the facility. The Gulf economic boom of the 1980s made it necessary to develop international connections to Kochi in the interests of expatriates working in the Middle East.

Construction

Approval was granted in May 1993. The funding was envisaged to be from interest-free loans from non-resident Indians working abroad, donations from industrial undertakings, exporters, cooperative societies and loans from the state government. A body called the Cochin International Airport Society, under the chairmanship of the chief minister of Kerala K. Karunakaran, was registered in July 1993 to execute the project.

In 1996, E. K. Nayanar took over as chairman of the CIAL project. The construction picked up momentum during this period and Nayanar ensured that the airport project received special attention from the State Government and gave his unstinted support to CIAL. By 1997, substantial land was taken into CIAL possession through negotiated settlements. Approximately 2,300 landowners and 872 families were resettled under a rehabilitation package. Major electric lines and an irrigation canal had to be diverted. The facility was formally inaugurated by the then President of India, K. R. Narayanan on 25 May 1999 and the first commercial service began on 10 June 1999. The operations from the old naval airport were moved to CIAL on 1 July 1999.

Expansion

Phase 1
The airport had  of floor space at its inauguration. CIAL envisioned four phases of expansion over 20 years, the third phase of which was completed in 2009. The original airport terminal was envisioned to handle just 100 passengers at a time. However, by 2001, the international passenger traffic were growing, making necessary to redevelop the terminal.

In 2002, the floor area for the international operations of the original building rose due to the completion of a separate domestic terminal, shifting all domestic operations there.

Phase 2

The cargo terminal was also expanded in the second phase.

Phase 3
Work on the third phase was intended to accommodate 5 million passenger movements annually and was started in 2007. The third phase involved the commissioning of a central block, connecting the domestic and international terminals and enlarging the airside area to accommodate more gates and waiting areas along with increased shopping areas. This increased the built-up area by another . The airside area of the international arrivals and departures blocks were integrated and glass walls were installed to allow for more natural light. The runway was re-surfaced in 2008. The number of parking areas were increased from 15 to 24, including three dedicated for cargo airlines. The third phase also completed the expansion of the cargo village and a second aircraft taxi-way to the MRO facility.

Phase 4
The fourth phase of expansion was originally planned to upgrade the domestic terminal, which has remained untouched in the past three phases. However, the expansion plans were changed after the new UDF government took over the administration of the state in May 2011.

As per the revised plans, the international terminal is to face a major renovation before being converted completely into a domestic terminal, while a new state-of-the-art international terminal is coming up. As per the new plans announced by the board of directors in September 2011, the new international terminal would come up on the eastern side of the existing structure. The built-up space of the new terminal would be  having segregated departures and arrivals at different levels. The new terminal with an elevation featuring Kerala temple architecture will have all the latest features of international standards. Construction major Larsen & Toubro is building the facility which will be ready within 30 months. The two-level terminal will have provisions for 112 check-in counters, with in-line baggage screening facilities, 100 immigration counters,  of duty-free shops at departure and arrival lounges, 19 boarding gates, 15 aerobridges, six baggage conveyor belts and fully covered alighting and boarding area.

The current domestic terminal would be converted into "Executive Pavilion" and would handle VIP and private chartered flights and jets. The current international terminal, once converted into a domestic terminal, will have 5 aerobridges and 10 boarding gates facility, apart from increased parking bays.

Management
Cochin International Airport is the first in India to be built in a public–private partnership and is owned by a public limited company called Cochin International Airport Limited, better known as CIAL, floated by the Government of Kerala in 1994. The Government of Kerala holds 33.36% stake, making it the single largest investor in the project. Indian government companies like Air India, BPCL, AAI hold 8.74% stake, while foreign companies like Abu Dhabi based Emke Group, the Oman-based Galfar Group, UAE based Majeed Bukatara Trading holds 5.42% stake. Indian companies hold 8.57% stake, while scheduled commercial banks like Federal Bank, SBT and Canara Bank holds 5.91%. The remaining 38.03% stake is held by more than 10,000 personal investors from 29 countries, mostly non-resident Indians.

The company has decided to go for public offering and giving 10 million shares to HUDCO as part of debt settlement, which would to lead HUDCO having 3.37% stake in the company and reduction of stake of other holders.

The Chief Minister of Kerala is the ex-officio chairman of CIAL.

Terminals
Cochin International Airport has three main terminals: two domestic and one international. There is also a cargo terminal.

Terminal 1 (Domestic)
Terminal 1 used to be an international terminal until the operations were shifted to the new international Terminal 3. The terminal underwent a massive upgrade and renovation after that, which took its total handling capacity to 4,000 passengers per hour which is 5 times the previous capacity. The renovated Terminal 1 was opened to travellers on 12 December 2018.

It is also equipped with 6 reserve lounges, art area, a food court, executive lounge, and a  shopping area. The terminal has a solar carport facility that can generate 2.4 MW of power and can house 1,400 cars. Together with the solar carport at the international Terminal 3, it can generate 5.1 MW of power which is the largest in a carport in the world.

Terminal 2 (Executive)
The departure hall has 26 common use terminal equipment (CUTE) enabled check-in counters, including 6 premium check-in counters, 4 self check in counters. It has 6 security gates and a common waiting area that can accommodate 400 passengers at a time. There is also a family lounge and a premium lounge for business class passengers and a food court is housed in the waiting area, while a restaurant operates in entry lobby. There are 4 remote gates facility available for domestic passengers. The arrivals hall has 2 baggage carousels. This block was converted into an executive terminal on 12 December 2018.

Terminal 3 (International)
The new international Terminal 3 was opened to travellers in March 2017. The theme of the terminal is inspired from Thrissur Pooram and is built in traditional Kerala architecture. 15 real size fibre elephants, adorning traditional costumes welcome the travellers at the departure facility area. The terminal has 5 entry gates, 84 check-in counters and 80 immigration counters. It is equipped with 10 escalators, 21 elevators, and 3 moving walkways. The terminal has a solar carport facility with capacity of generating 2.7 MW power and can provide parking facility to 1,400 cars. Along with the solar carport at the domestic Terminal 1, it is the largest solar carport in the world with a total capacity of 5.1 MW of power and parking facility to 2,800 cars.

The ground level handles arrivals. The second level (5.5 metres above ground level) also handles arrivals and is equipped with 30 immigration counters, 10 e-T-Visa counters, 5 health check counters, and 2 moving walkways. The third level (10.5 metres above ground level) is the departure facility area. It has a  check-in area, 3 check-in islands having total of 84 counters, 40 emigration counters, an  departure duty-free shop, 3 VIP reserved lounges, airline offices, 2 prayer rooms, and 1 moving walkway. The fourth level (15.5 metres above ground level) is the departure security hold area.

Cargo centre
Cochin Airport has a dedicated cargo centre on the eastern side of the complex. There are three complexes in the cargo village:

 The Centre for Perishable Cargo (CPC) is the largest dedicated cold storage centre for perishable goods in India. It was commissioned in 2008 at a cost of  jointly by CIAL, Government of India through Agricultural and Food Promotion Export Development Authority (APEDA), and Government of Kerala.
 The Transshipment Cargo Complex is a dedicated warehouse allocated for transshipment cargo. The import and export cargo from the customs warehouses in the catchment area, as well as from airports like Chennai, Bangalore, Coimbatore, etc., are handled and stored at this centre for export.

In addition, an exclusive domestic cargo complex has also been constructed for private domestic logistics firms and India Post services.

Business Jet Terminal
According to CIAL, it is now only the fourth airport in India with a largest terminal for business jets. The terminal is expected to provide customised services to charter and private jets.

“This terminal stands unique as it is India’s first Charter Gateway. This one-of-a-kind terminal integrates tourism, international summits, business conferences and the movement of high net worth individuals, also accentuates the idea of cost-effectiveness in the development of an elegant airport terminal,” CIAL said in a release.
Besides, it comprises an exclusive private car parking space, drive-in porch, a grand lobby, five opulent lounge, a business centre, duty free shop, foreign exchange counter and high-end video conferencing room. “Upgradation and modernisation of transport systems are indispensable for industrial development in Kerala,” said Kerala CM Pinarayi Vijayan after inaugurating the terminal.

Infrastructure

Air traffic control
The airport has two instrument landing systems (ILS) using distance measuring equipment (DME) which enable flights to land from both sides of the runway even in rough weather conditions. CIAL is the only airport in the country besides the airport in metros to have such facility. The ATC uses Doppler VHF omni range I and II.

Large-scale upgrades such as the latest AIRCON 2100 air traffic control automation system were also introduced.

Airport surveillance radar
The Airports Authority of India has installed an advanced airport surveillance radar (ASR) as well as monopulse secondary surveillance radar (MSSR). In addition, a surface movement radar was installed for effective monitoring of flights on the runway and in parking bays.

Runway
Cochin International Airport has one 3,400m long runway oriented as 27/09, which can handle Code E planes. The  apron comprising 16 stands can accommodate five wide bodied and eight narrow bodied aircraft. The runway is spread over the panchayat areas of Nedumbasserry, Sreemoolanagaram and Kanjoor.

Cochin Airport has one helipad for dedicated use of helicopters, meant for air-taxi purposes. Plans for constructing a heliport is underway.

Naval Air Enclave

The Indian Navy has set up a Naval Aircraft Enclave at Cochin International Airport Ltd. (CIAL). The Naval Aircraft Enclave comprises a hangar for bigger aircraft of the Navy, administrative office, disbursal center, apron capable of holding 2 Boeing type aircraft (P-8I long-range maritime reconnaissance aircraft) and a taxi track. The Naval Aircraft Enclave at Cochin airport is the second such facility of the Navy attached to an international airport, after Mumbai. It is the first public-private participation model airport to hand over land to the Navy for such a facility.

Indian Coast Guard Air Enclave
The Indian Coast Guard has taken space in CIAL to develop its second air squadron in Kochi after INS Garuda facility to improve coastal air surveillance and air related assistance.

The facility comprises 2 hangars to accommodate the Chetak helicopter squadron, and the Dornier squadron along with advanced light helicopters are expected to be based here. The Air Enclave would have a 50m taxi link to the runway at CIAL and would consist of aircraft hangars, technical areas and administrative buildings.

Airlines and destinations

Passenger

Cargo
The following cargo airlines fly to the airport:

 SpiceXpress

Statistics

Security
Cochin International Airport is listed among the 12 major airports of India. Its safety and security is handled by the Bureau of Civil Aviation Security through the Central Industrial Security Force (CISF). Cochin was the third international airport and the first private airport in the country to come under the cover of CISF in 2001, after the Government of India decided to hand over airport security to CISF in the wake of the hijacking of Indian Airlines Flight 814. Security was handled by the Kerala Police; Special Branch of Kochi Police before the CISF. The airport company's Aviation Safety Wing (ASW) oversees security facilities and equipment. The ASW is also responsible for fire and emergency services.

Security management training is provided by CIAL's Aviation Academy and personnel are employed by the company as security agents – deployed in baggage screening rooms, entry gates, the general cargo area and the lounge areas. CIAL ASW employs Army-trained sniffer dogs to check for explosives in baggage areas, the only Indian airport to have such a facility. CIAL has introduced three state-of-the-art ION scanning detectors that can identify small amounts of material, down to nanograms, of explosives.

The airport is under the direct protection of the Kochi City Police, who have a station outside the terminal. CISF maintains two armed squadrons and one bomb detection and disposal squad. CISF has a command center 250metres outside the terminal, with an intelligence division and mobilization cell. The air customs division operates a narcotics detection squad in the terminal. The CIAL ASWs are working on installing a fully automated perimeter intrusion detection system that will detect any possible violation, using sensors that will provide critical time for the security forces to react. Phase one of the intrusion prevention system is in place with barricades, automatic retractable bollards, surveillance cameras, parking gate management systems and the introduction of biometric ID cards for staff.

The immigration department is handled by Kerala Police, Special Branch officials trained by the Bureau of Immigration.

The airport company also has a high-end robotic security system capable of remote-handling of explosive devices and fire-fighting and hostage situations. The system is operational from September 2014, making CIAL the first in South India to have such a facility. It comprises safety robots developed by Canada-based Pedsco Ltd. and Threat Containment Vessel (TCV) and sophisticated luggage containment vehicle – both developed by Nabco, USA. The main equipment of the system is a threat containment vessel (TCV) carried by robots, which is capable of containing a blast of minimum 8 kg of TNT or equivalent quantity of explosive, triggered by suspected luggage including chemicals, radioactive materials and bombs. The container is reusable as it withstands repeated detonations and size of the TCV can be adjusted with the size of the suspected baggage. In addition to TCV, the technology also comprises a remote mobile Investigator (RMI)-9WT, which is a multipurpose six-wheel vehicle with removable tracks for step climbing capability. Using fixed arm extenders, the robot can be configured for different applications such as under car searches and second-store window access.

Education and training
Since 2008, CIAL has been the first airport to venture into providing higher education in aviation management and technical areas to overcome the shortage of skilled manpower in the aviation industry. CIAL has teamed up with the Indira Gandhi National Open University (IGNOU) to start two schools in aviation education.

CIAL Aviation Academy provides two-year management degrees in aviation and airport management, operations, economics, finance and human resources, along with short-term aviation oriented vocational diplomas. The academy also trains technical manpower required for airport operations. Air India Express has its temporary stewards grooming and training center in the facility.

Aviation Security Training Institute – The Aviation Security Training Institute (ASTI), envisioned by the Bureau of Civil Aviation Security has been inaugurated in February 2014. The institute has state-of-the-art facilities like X-ray simulators (21), explosive model room, two classrooms with LCD projectors and other training infrastructures. Explosive model rooms display different types of switch mechanism to trigger explosion. Library consists of CDs, catering to International Civil Aviation With the establishment of ASTI in Kochi, employees and management personnel from Mangalore, Kozhikode, Coimbatore, Trichy, Madurai and Thiruvananthapuram airports can take training here. Employees of the proposed Kannur international airport are also likely to be trained here.

Ground transportation
CIAL is located between National Highway 544 (NH 544), one of the main highways of South India and the Main Central Road (MC Road), one of the State Highways of Kerala. An expressway is planned from NH 49 to the MC Road to facilitate faster transport. Though the main railway line is only about 500metres from the airport, the nearest station is Angamaly about 8 km away.

Air-taxi services 
Cochin airport has dedicated air-taxi services for passengers to travel to major pilgrim destinations in Kerala as well as to cities like Trivandrum and in northern Kerala like Kozhikode. In association with Bharat Airways, it provides scheduled air-taxi services to Sabarimala.

CIAL Aerotropolis
The Aerotropolis was proposed by its founder, V.J. Kurien, to ensure additional revenue sources for the growth of the company and to increase airport traffic through tourism and allied activities. The  Aerotropolis first began in Nedumbassery and nearby villages, aimed to convert into a self-sustainable town, with the airport forming the core element with a residential zone. Work on the Aerotropolis commenced in 2007, and most of the aerotropolis has been completed, as of 2023.

Manufacturing and business zone
The master plan envisages the creation of a Special Economic Zone (SEZ) for aircraft-allied industries, especially spare parts and OEM manufacturing units, an airline research and development center, workshops and service zones. In addition to this an Information Technology Park, with dedicated airline support technology, design and development centers is also proposed. An integrated logistics center and central container freight station are planned at the cargo village.

CIAL's proposal for establishing the SEZ was approved by the Board of Approval of SEZs in 2008; however, work is yet to start due to the  global recession. The project is estimated was started in August 2011, and some parts are completed, as of 2023.

CIAL solar power project
CIAL Solar Power Project is a 15 megawatt (MW) photovoltaic power station built by CIAL. Cochin International Airport became the first fully solar-powered airport in the world with the commissioning of the plant.

The plant comprises 46,150 solar panels laid across  near the international cargo complex. The plant has been installed by the German-based M/s Bosch Ltd. It is capable of generating 50,000 units of electricity daily, and is equipped with a supervisory control and data acquisition system (SCADA), through which remote monitoring is carried out. The project components include PV modules of 265Wp capacity manufactured by Renesola, and inverters of 1MW capacity manufactured by ABB India.

The plant is coupled with a 1.1 MW solar plant that was commissioned in 2013, the first megawatt scale installation of Solar PV system in the state of Kerala. This plant was installed by Emvee Photovoltaic Power Pvt. Ltd., consisting of 4,000 monocrystalline modules of 250Wp and 33 string inverters of 30 kW capacity each.

CIAL has doubled the solar production to 28.8 MW of power production within 2 years as part an ambitious plan to expand solar power with 3 major projects which are on construction stages. The first came up over a  canal near to the airport, the second was through development of India's first solar carport roof utility plan and the third will use ground level panels on open space near the airport.

Accidents and Incidents
 On 30 July 1998, Indian Airlines Flight 503, a Dornier 228 from Agathi, crashed into a building after takeoff, killing all six people on board and three more people in the building.
 On 25 April 2010, Emirates Flight EK 530, a Boeing 777-200 from Dubai, dropped around  during heavy turbulence as the aircraft entered a thick cumulonimbus cloud while on its descent. 20 passengers were injured and some internal damage was caused to the plane. The aircraft was on descent into Kochi when the incident occurred. There were 350 passengers and 14 crew on board.
 On 25 August 2011, a 13-year-old boy was found roaming around the runway area, raising questions about the security system of the airport.
 On 29 August 2011, Gulf Air Flight GF 270, an Airbus A320 from Bahrain, carrying 137 passengers skidded off the runway at 3.55 am during its descent. The reason for the crash is suspected to be the heavy rain at the time. The aircraft had been said to have slipped off the runway and landed nose first. The aircraft broke one of its wings while landing and stalled air traffic for hours. Passengers after the crash, in chaos, were reported to have jumped from the aircraft through emergency exit doors even before stairways were brought into place. The crash caused seven minor injuries and two serious injuries due to the chaos that followed.
 On 4 September 2017, Air India Express Flight IX 452, a Boeing 737-800 which arrived from Abu Dhabi, got stuck in the drain canal while taxiing to the international terminal 3 after landing. Passengers and crew were safely evacuated. The incident happened when the pilot took a wrong turn from the parallel taxiway, almost 90 meters before the link taxiway through which the aircraft was supposed to vacate.
 In 2018, an Indigo employee and his friend were nabbed after it was discovered they used a fake ID.

2018 Kerala floods
As a consequence of 2018 Kerala floods, the airport was closed 1429 August 2018. The runway and other facilities were non-functional due to excessive flooding and inclement weather. Flights to Kochi were diverted to and were operating from other airports in the state like Thiruvananthapuram and Kozhikode. From 20 August 2018, INS Garuda (a naval airbase in Kochi) was used as a civilian airport for small aircraft operations to neighbouring cities like Bangalore, Chennai, and Coimbatore. The airport reopened on 29 August 2018, 14:00 Indian Standard Time (UTC+05:30). It suffered an estimated loss of  during the closed period.

2019 Kerala floods
As a consequence of 2019 Kerala floods, water logging in the runway due to the heavy rains lead to temporary suspension of airport operations from 8 August 2019 to 12:00 Indian Standard Time on 11 August 2019.

Awards and accolades
Cochin International Airport achieved major international recognition in 2015 when it became the first fully solar-powered airport in the world. In 2017, it also became the first airport in the world to implement a solar carport, a parking bay with rooftop solar panels. The airport was selected as "the best non-metro airport in India" in 2016 by the Air Passengers Association of India. The airport has also won numerous awards for energy conservation, productivity and infrastructure.
In July 2018, the airport was selected for the Champion of the Earth award, the highest environmental honour instituted by the United Nations.

References

External links

 Cochin International Airport at Airports Authority of India web site
 Cochin Airport Official Website
 

Airports in Kerala
International airports in India
Transport in Kochi
Buildings and structures in Ernakulam district
Convention centres in India
1999 establishments in Kerala
Airports established in 1999
20th-century architecture in India